Llewelyn C. Davies (1881-1961) was a Welsh international footballer. He played club football for Wrexham, Everton and West Bromwich Albion, playing on two occasions alongside his younger brother Arthur.

Davies was capped 23 times for Wales, and captained them against Ireland. His association with Wrexham was long-lasting – he played as an amateur and a professional before and after the First World War.

During the war he served in Italy and France.

References

Welsh footballers
Everton F.C. players
West Bromwich Albion F.C. players
Wrexham A.F.C. players
Wales international footballers
Wales amateur international footballers
Association football fullbacks
1881 births
1961 deaths